Frankie Laine's Golden Hits is a compilation album by Frankie Laine, released in 1961 by Mercury Records.

The album, available both in mono and in stereo, was a remastered compilation of the singer's early hits such as "That Lucky Old Sun", "That's My Desire", "Mule Train", "The Cry of the Wild Goose".

Track listing

References 

1961 compilation albums
Frankie Laine albums
Mercury Records compilation albums